Meredith Bright Colket (November 19, 1878 – June 7, 1947) was an American pole vaulter who competed in the 1900 Summer Olympics in Paris and won the silver medal in the men's pole vault ahead of Norwegian Carl-Albert Andersen who won bronze. Irving Baxter won gold.

Colket was born on November 19, 1878 in Philadelphia. He graduated from the University of Pennsylvania with a B.S. degree in 1901 and a LL.B degree in 1904. He was a member of Phi Gamma Delta and the varsity track team for all four of his undergraduate years. He organized the first tennis team at Penn and won second place at the intercollegiate tennis doubles championship in 1902. He worked as an attorney for the General Accident Fire & Life Insurance Corporation and continued to play tennis at the Merion Cricket Club. He married Alberta Kelsey on April 12, 1911 in London.

He died of a heart attack at his home in Bryn Mawr, Pennsylvania on June 7, 1947.  He was interred in the family plot at Laurel Hill Cemetery in Philadelphia.

Colket's son, Meredith B. Colket Jr. (1912–1985), was a noted genealogist.

References

External links
 New York Times obituary, June 9, 1947 (subscription required)
 Phi Gamma Delta in the Olympics

1878 births
1947 deaths
American businesspeople in insurance
American male pole vaulters
Athletes (track and field) at the 1900 Summer Olympics
Burials at Laurel Hill Cemetery (Philadelphia)
Medalists at the 1900 Summer Olympics
Olympic silver medalists for the United States in track and field
Pennsylvania lawyers
Penn Quakers men's tennis players
People from Bryn Mawr, Pennsylvania
Track and field athletes from Philadelphia
University of Pennsylvania alumni